Bifora radians, the wild bishop, is a species of annual herb in the family Apiaceae. They have a self-supporting growth form and simple, broad leaves. Individuals can grow to 31 cm tall.

Sources

References 

radians
Flora of Malta